Scolopia braunii is an Australian rainforest tree. Common names for this species include flintwood, mountain cherry, brown birch and scolopia. The habitat is Australian coastal rainforests of various types.

The natural range of distribution of Scolopia braunii is between Jervis Bay (35° S) in the south to Cape York Peninsula at the northernmost part of Australia.

Description

A medium-sized tree growing to 25 metres tall and 50 cm in stem diameter. The trunk is flanged or somewhat buttressed on larger trees. The thin orange/brown bark has small raised irregularities and scaly depressions.

Young rhomboid shaped red leaves form on slender branchlets, marked with pale lenticels. Leaves alternate, sometimes toothed, 4 to 9 cm long. Creamy white flowers form on panicles in September to November. The fruit is a red berry, turning black when mature, 1 cm in diameter containing two to four seeds. The fruit ripens from December to April. Germination from seed is erratic, sometimes coming up within three weeks. Other times germination is slow and difficult. However, cuttings prove more successful.

References

 Floyd, A.G., Rainforest Trees of Mainland South-eastern Australia, Inkata Press 1989, 

braunii
Malpighiales of Australia
Trees of Australia
Flora of New South Wales
Flora of Queensland
Ornamental trees
Taxa named by Johann Friedrich Klotzsch